Bruno Oberhammer (born 17 October 1955) is an Italian para-alpine skier.

Oberhammer competed at the Winter Paralympics in 1984, 1988, 1992, 1994 and 1998 and, in total, he won three gold medals, five silver medals and four bronze medals.

Biography 

Oberhammer first competed in the Paralympics at the 1984 Winter Paralympics in Innsbruck, Austria at the Alpine Combination B2, Downhill B2 and Giant Slalom B2 events. He won the bronze medal at the Alpine Combination B2 event. At the 1988 Winter Paralympics, the 1992 Winter Paralympics and the 1994 Winter Paralympics Oberhammer won a medal in each event that he competed in. He also won a gold medal and two bronze medals at the 1998 Winter Paralympics.

Achievements 

 1984 Winter Paralympics
  Men's Alpine Combination B2
 1988 Winter Paralympics
  Men's Giant Slalom B3
  Men's Downhill B3
 1992 Winter Paralympics
  Men's Super-G B3
  Men's Giant Slalom B3
 1994 Winter Paralympics
  Men's Slalom B3
  Men's Super-G B3
  Men's Giant Slalom B3
  Men's Downhill B3
 1998 Winter Paralympics
  Men's Slalom B1,3
  Men's Super-G B1,3
  Men's Downhill B1,3

See also 
 List of Paralympic medalists in alpine skiing

References

External links
 

Living people
1955 births
Paralympic alpine skiers of Italy
Alpine skiers at the 1984 Winter Paralympics
Alpine skiers at the 1988 Winter Paralympics
Alpine skiers at the 1992 Winter Paralympics
Alpine skiers at the 1994 Winter Paralympics
Alpine skiers at the 1998 Winter Paralympics
Medalists at the 1984 Winter Paralympics
Medalists at the 1988 Winter Paralympics
Medalists at the 1992 Winter Paralympics
Medalists at the 1994 Winter Paralympics
Medalists at the 1998 Winter Paralympics
Paralympic bronze medalists for Italy
Paralympic silver medalists for Italy
Paralympic gold medalists for Italy
Paralympic medalists in alpine skiing
Italian alpine skiing coaches
20th-century Italian people